Namma Veetu Ponnu is a 2021 Indian television drama which premiered on Star Vijay and stream on Disney+ Hotstar. It was produced by Global Villagers. It is the remake of Khorkuto which airs on Star Jalsha.

Synopsis
It is a family drama revolving around a girl, Meenakshi, who crosses paths with a scientist, Karthik who belongs to a middle-class joint family, and everything changes. Apart from a love story, It narrates the tale of a joint family, its roots, and beliefs.

Cast

Main 
 Ashwini Aanandita as Meenakshi Karthik – Chezhiyan and Gayatri's daughter; Divya's cousin; Anu's best friend; Karthi's wife
 Surjith Kumar as Karthik "Karthi" Vasudevan – Vasudevan and Nandini's son; Malar's brother; Shiva, Pavithra and Anu's cousin; Meenakshi's husband

Supporting 
 Sherin Jaanu / Lailaa as Divya – Selvi's daughter; Meenakshi's cousin; Karthi's best friend who one-sidedly loves him (Main Antagonist)
 Ravi Chandran as Velayudham aka Velu – The Head of the Family; Vasudevan, Thiyagu and Paaru's brother; Visalam's husband; Shiva and Pavithra's father. Vadivu's father-in-law.
 Nithya Ravindran / Revathee Shankar as Visalatchi "Visalam" Velayudham – Velu's wife; Shiva and Pavithra's mother. Vadivu"s mother-in-law.
 Tamil Selvi / Sri Priya as Nandhini Vasudevan – Vasudevan's wife; Karthi and Malar's mother. Meenakshi's mother-in-law.
 Venkat Subramanian as Thiyagarajan aka Thiyagu – Velu, Vasudevan and Paaru's brother; Kallu's husband; Anu's father
 VJ Sandhya as Kalyani "Kallu" Thiyagarajan – Thiyagu's wife; Anu's mother
 Amrutha Abishek as Parvathy aka Paaru – Velu, Vasudevan and Thiyagu's sister; Mahesh's wife 
 Vetri Velan as Mahesh – Paaru's Husband 
 Vaishali Taniga as Malarvizhi "Malar" Vasudevan Kalaiyarasan – Vasudevan and Nandhini's daughter; Karthi's sister; Shiva, Pavithra and Anu's cousin; Kalai's wife
 VJ Pappu as Kalaiyarasan aka Kalai – Devagi's son; Malar's husband
 Arunima Sudhakar as Anuradha "Anu" Thiyagarajan – Thiyagu and Kalyani's daughter; Shiva, Pavithra, Karthi and Malar's cousin; Meenakshi's best friend
 Praveen Nandagopal / Jack as Shivakanth "Shiva" Velayudham – Velu and Visalam's son; Pavithra's younger brother. Karthi, Malar and Anu's cousin; Vadivu's husband.
 Shabhanam as Vadivukarasi "Vadivu" Shivakanth – Shiva's wife
 M. J. Shriram as Dr. Chezhiyan – Selvi's brother; Gayatri's husband; Meenakshi's father
 Priyadharshini Neelakandan / Banumathi as Selvi – Chezhiyan's sister; Divya's mother; Meenakshi's aunt
 Prakash Rajan as Divya's father and Selvi's estranged husband
 Sujatha Panju / Kiruba as Dr. Gayatri Chezhiyan – Chezhiyan's wife; Meenakshi's mother
 Manoj Kumar as Vasudevan – Velu, Thiyagu and Paaru's brother; Nandhini's husband; Karthi and Malar's father
 Magesh as Dinesh – Meenakshi's close friend
 Gayatri Devi as Devagi – Kalai's mother
 Salma as Devi – Mahesh's sister-in-law
 Arun as Bharathi – Pavithra’s son; Visalatchi and Velayadhum's grandson
 Yamuna Chinnadurai as Dr. Jeevapriya (Jeeva) – Meenakshi's collegemate

Adaptations

References

Star Vijay original programming
Tamil-language television soap operas
Tamil-language romance television series
2021 Tamil-language television series debuts
Tamil-language television series based on Bengali-languages television series